Richard Hoare may refer to:
Richard Hoare (banker) (1648–1719), founder of C. Hoare & Co, one of the United Kingdom's oldest private banks
Sir Richard Hoare, 1st Baronet (1735–1787), see Hoare baronets
Sir Richard Hoare, 2nd Baronet (1758–1838), English antiquarian, archaeologist, artist and traveller
Richard Q. "Tigger" Hoare (1943–2020), founder of The Bulldog Trust

See also
 Richard Hore, early English explorer of Canada